Juliane Rautenberg (born 2 July 1966 in Berlin, Germany) is a former German television actress.

Rautenberg made her first appearance on German television in 1988 in Die Wicherts von nebenan. She appeared in five episodes of Derrick, which aired between 1991 and 1994.

External links

German television actresses
Actresses from Berlin
1966 births
Living people
20th-century German actresses